The 1995 Five Nations Championship was the 66th Five Nations Championship, the annual Northern Hemisphere rugby union competition contested by the national teams of England, France, Ireland, Scotland and Wales. It was also the last Five Nations held in the sport's amateur era, as rugby union's governing body, the International Rugby Football Board, opened the sport to professionalism on August 26 of that year. Including the previous incarnations as the Home Nations and Five Nations, this was the hundred-and-first series of the northern hemisphere rugby union championship. Ten matches were played over five weekends from 21 January to 18 March. It was also the fifth occasion, after 1978, 1984, 1990 and 1991, on which two teams each with three victories faced off against each other in the final round of matches, with both capable of completing a Grand Slam with a victory, and the second time that the Triple Crown had also been at stake at the same time, as a result of England and Scotland's earlier victories over the other Home Nations. The tournament took a surprisingly similar course to five years earlier, where England and Scotland both won their first three matches and met in the final week, with an undefeated record, a Grand Slam, Triple Crown and the Calcutta Cup all at stake for the victor: however, this time it was England who prevailed in the deciding match. Even the minor placings were the same as in 1990, as France came third, Ireland fourth and Wales were whitewashed.

Participants
The teams involved were:

Squads

Table

Results

External links
1995 Five Nations Championship at ESPN

1995 rugby union tournaments for national teams
1995
1994–95 in European rugby union
1994–95 in Irish rugby union
1994–95 in English rugby union
1994–95 in Welsh rugby union
1994–95 in Scottish rugby union
1994–95 in French rugby union
Five Nations
Five Nations
Five Nations